was the 58th single of the J-pop group Morning Musume. It is to be the first single released under the Morning Musume '15 name, scheduled for release on April 15, 2015.

Tie-in with anime 
Ima Koko Kara will be the first anime song performed by the group, to be used as the ending theme for the movie Pretty Cure All Stars: Spring Carnival. The song itself was first revealed during the second trailer for Pretty Cure All Stars: Spring Carnival, made public in late 2014. On February 10, 2015, Hello! Project confirmed the project and Morning Musume's involvement. Additionally, the ending dance of the film includes all 40 Pretty Cures alongside Morning Musume 15 and a selected group of young fans.

Three of the current members of the group: Haruna Iikubo, Ayumi Ishida, and Sakura Oda will voice three original characters in the film. The song marks the first Pretty Cure song performed by an artist outside of the franchise.

Release details
On February 15, Hello!Project revealed the full single with Ima Koko Kara being its third A-Side track alongside two new songs Seishun Kozo ga Naiteiru and Yuugure wa Ameagari. It will be released in four limited CD+DVD editions and two regular CD only editions.

Because Suzuki Kanon was not completely healed from an ankle fracture, Miyamoto Karin from Juice=Juice was used as her substitute for the "Seishun Kozou ga Naiteiru" and "Yuugure wa Ameagari" music videos and promotion edits. It was previously thought she would only be featured in the dance shot, similar to when Ishida Ayumi replaced Miyamoto in the dance shot for Ijiwaru Shinai de Dakishimete. It was revealed on an early leak of Yuugure wa Ameagari and the Hello Project! Station versions of both songs that Miyamoto had been given close up shots in the full Promotion Edit (YouTube, Television ver.) and Music Video (Original ver. on the Limited Edition DVDs) as well while Suzuki was notably absent entirely. Suzuki was, however, present in the Another Ver. of Seishun Kozou ga Naiteiru. On the day of the single release, solo member commercials for "Seishun Kozou ga Naiteiru" were aired on screens in Shibuya featuring close-up scenes from the music video. An edition featuring Suzuki Kanon also aired, which has since created rumours for a new edit of the music video.

Members at time of single 
 9th generation: Mizuki Fukumura, Erina Ikuta, Riho Sayashi, Kanon Suzuki
 10th generation: Haruna Iikubo, Ayumi Ishida, Masaki Sato, Haruka Kudo
 11th generation: Sakura Oda
 12th generation : Haruna Ogata, Miki Nonaka, Maria Makino, Akane Haga

Track list

See also
 Pretty Cure All Stars

References

2015 singles
Anime songs
2015 songs
Japanese-language songs
Morning Musume songs
Japanese synth-pop songs
Pretty Cure songs